Bohai Bank Tower is a skyscraper in Tianjin, China. The 55 story building was completed in 2015, construction having begun in 2010.

See also
Skyscraper design and construction
List of tallest buildings in China

References

Buildings and structures in Tianjin
Office buildings completed in 2015